Stephen Chase (July 28, 1874 – October 5, 1968) was an American college football coach. He served as the head coach at Knox College in Galesburg, Illinois for one season, in 1896, compiling a record of 2–6–1.

Head coaching record

References

External links
 

1874 births
1968 deaths
Dartmouth Big Green men's track and field athletes
Knox Prairie Fire athletic directors
Knox Prairie Fire football coaches
People from Hanover, New Hampshire